David Stuart (March 12, 1816 – September 12, 1868) was a politician from the U.S. state of Michigan and an officer in the Union Army during the American Civil War.

Early life and education
Stuart was born in Brooklyn, New York, the son of Robert Stuart, discoverer of the South Pass in Wyoming. He attended Phillips Academy, Oberlin College, and Amherst College, graduating in 1838. He studied law, was admitted to the bar and commenced practice in Detroit.

Career
He was elected as a Democrat to the 33rd Congress, serving from March 4, 1853, to March 3, 1855. He chaired the Committee on Expenditures in the Department of the Treasury.

He was an unsuccessful candidate for reelection in 1854 to the 34th Congress, and left for Chicago, to become lawyer for the Illinois Central Railroad.

Civil War
Stuart moved to Chicago, and enlisted in the Union Army. He raised 2,000 volunteers and equipped them at his own expense.

He was commissioned lieutenant colonel of the 42nd Regiment, Illinois Volunteer Infantry, July 22, 1861, and then colonel of the 55th Illinois Volunteer Infantry Regiment, October 31, 1861.

He commanded the 2nd Brigade in William T. Sherman's division at the Battle of Shiloh and was badly wounded. He was appointed brigadier general of volunteers, November 29, 1862.

During the Vicksburg Campaign he led his brigade at the Battle of Chickasaw Bayou and at the Arkansas Post.

On March 11, 1863, the U.S. Senate declined to confirm his nomination to brigadier general, and Stuart resigned on April 3, 1863.

Later life and death
Stuart resumed the practice of law in Detroit, where he died and is interred in Elmwood Cemetery.

See also

 Bibliography of the American Civil War

References

Sources

 Retrieved on 2008-02-15
The Political Graveyard
Elmwood Cemetery Biography on David Stuart

External links

1816 births
1868 deaths
Politicians from Brooklyn
Democratic Party members of the United States House of Representatives from Michigan
Politicians from Chicago
19th-century American politicians
Amherst College alumni
People of Illinois in the American Civil War
Union Army officers
Burials at Elmwood Cemetery (Detroit)